The Seven Sages (of Greece) or Seven Wise Men (Greek:  hoi hepta sophoi) was the title given by classical Greek tradition to seven philosophers, statesmen, and law-givers of the 7–6th century BC who were renowned for their wisdom.

The Seven Sages

Typically the list of the seven sages includes:

 Thales of Miletus is the first well-known Greek philosopher, mathematician, and astronomer. The ancient biographer Diogenes Laertius attributes the aphorism, "Know thyself", engraved on the front facade of the Temple of Apollo in Delphi, to Thales, although there was no ancient consensus on this attribution.
 Pittacus of Mytilene governed Mytilene (Lesbos). He tried to reduce the power of the nobility and was able to govern with the support of the demos, whom he favoured.
 Bias of Priene was a politician and legislator of the 6th century BC.
 Solon of Athens was a famous legislator and reformer from Athens, framing the laws that shaped the Athenian democracy.
 The fifth and sixth sage are variously given as two of: Cleobulus, tyrant of Lindos, reported as either the grandfather or father-in-law of Thales; Periander of Corinth (b. before 634 BC, d. ); Myson of Chenae (6th century BC); Anacharsis the Scythian (6th century BC).
 Chilon of Sparta was a Spartan politician to whom the militarization of Spartan society was attributed.

Diogenes Laërtius points out, however, that there was among his sources great disagreement over which figures should be counted among the seven. Perhaps the two most common substitutions were to exchange Periander or Anacharsis for Myson. On Diogenes' first list of seven, which he introduces with the words "These men are acknowledged wise", Periander appears instead of Myson; the same substitution appears in The Masque of the Seven Sages by Ausonius. Both Ephorus and Plutarch (in his Banquet of the Seven Sages) substituted Anacharsis for Myson. Diogenes Laërtius further states that Dicaearchus gave ten possible names, Hippobotus suggested twelve names, and Hermippus enumerated seventeen possible sages from which different people made different selections of seven. Leslie Kurke contends that "Aesop was a popular contender for inclusion in the group"; an epigram of the 6th century AD poet Agathias (Palatine Anthology 16.332) refers to a statue of the Seven Sages, with Aesop standing before them.

Interpretations 
In Plato's Protagoras, Socrates says:

The section of the Protagoras in which appears this passage is "elaborately ironical", making it unclear which of its parts may be taken seriously,

Diogenes Laërtius writes in his account of the life of Pyrrho, the founder of Pyrrhonism, that the Seven Sages of Greece were considered to be precursors of Pyrrho's philosophical skepticism because the Delphic Maxims were skeptical. "The maxims of the Seven Wise Men, too, they call skeptical; for instance, 'Observe the Golden Mean', and 'A pledge is a curse at one's elbow', meaning that whoever plights his troth steadfastly and trustfully brings a curse on his own head."

Sources and legends 

The oldest explicit mention on record of a standard list of seven sages is in Plato's Protagoras, quoted above.

Diogenes Laërtius reported that there were seven individuals who were held in high esteem for their wisdom well before Plato's time. According to Demetrius Phalereus, it was during the archonship of Damasias (582/81 BC) that the seven first become known as "the wise men", Thales being the first so acknowledged.

Later tradition ascribed to each sage a pithy saying of his own, but ancient as well as modern scholars have doubted the legitimacy of such ascriptions.  A compilation of 147 maxims, inscribed at Delphi, was preserved by the fifth century AD scholar Stobaeus as "Sayings of the Seven Sages", but "the actual authorship of the ... maxims set up on the Delphian temple may be left uncertain.  Most likely they were popular proverbs, which tended later to be attributed to particular sages."

In addition to being credited for pithy sayings, the wise men were also apparently famed for practical inventions; in Plato's Republic (600a), it is said that it "befits a wise man" to have "many inventions and useful devices in the crafts or sciences" attributed to him, citing Thales and Anacharsis the Scythian as examples.

According to a number of moralistic stories, there was a golden tripod (or, in some versions of the story, a bowl or cup) which was to be given to the wisest.  Allegedly, it passed in turn from one of the seven sages to another, beginning with Thales, until one of them (either Thales or Solon, depending on the story) finally dedicated it to Apollo who was held to be wisest of all.

According to Diogenes, Dicaearchus claimed that the seven "were neither wise men nor philosophers, but merely shrewd men, who had studied legislation."  And according to at least one modern scholar, the claim is correct:  "With the exception of Thales, no one whose life is contained in [Diogenes'] Book I [i.e. none of the above] has any claim to be styled a philosopher."

See also
Sage (sophos)
Saptarishi

References

External links

 
 Plutarch's The Dinner of the Seven Wise Men, in the Loeb Classical Library.
 Seven Sages of Greece with illustrations and further links.
 Jona Lendering's article Seven Sages includes a chart of various canonical lists.
 Sentences of the Seven Sages
 Fragment of a poem in which the Seven Wise Men were mentioned together, from Oxyrhynchus Papyri

 
Ancient Greek titles
Articles about multiple people in ancient Greece
Septets